Arthur Tonkin may refer to:

 Arthur Tonkin (politician) (1930–2022), Western Australian politician
 Arthur Tonkin (rugby union) (1922–1991), Australian rugby union player